Gibeauxiella is a genus of moths in the family Cosmopterigidae.

Species
Gibeauxiella bellaqueifontis (Gibeaux, 1986)
Gibeauxiella genitrix (Meyrick, 1927)
Gibeauxiella reliqua (Gibeaux, 1986)

References
Natural History Museum Lepidoptera genus database

Antequerinae